Bred in Old Kentucky is a 1926 American silent sports film directed by Edward Dillon and starring Viola Dana, Jerry Miley and Jed Prouty.

Cast
 Viola Dana as Katie O'Doone 
 Jerry Miley as Dennis Reilly
 Jed Prouty as Jake Trumbull 
 Jim Mason as Tod Cuyler 
 Roy Laidlaw as Mr. Welkin
 Josephine Crowell as Landlady

References

Bibliography
 Munden, Kenneth White. The American Film Institute Catalog of Motion Pictures Produced in the United States, Part 1. University of California Press, 1997.

External links

1926 films
1920s sports films
American horse racing films
Films directed by Edward Dillon
American silent feature films
Film Booking Offices of America films
American black-and-white films
1920s English-language films
1920s American films
Silent sports films